The First Virginia General Assembly convened from  to  in regular session.  This session took place while the Second Continental Congress was still in session.

Major events
 December 25, 1776: George Washington lead about 2,400 soldiers across the Delaware River to launch a surprise attack on the British Army at Trenton, New Jersey.
 December 26, 1776: George Washington and his army surprised about 1,500 Hessian auxiliaries at the Battle of Trenton and took over 900 prisoners.

Sessions
 1st Regular session: October 7, 1776December 21, 1776

Leaders

Senate leadership
 Speaker of the Senate: Archibald Cary

Assembly leadership
 Speaker of the Assembly: Edmund Pendleton

Members

Members of the Senate
Members of the Senate of Virginia for the First Virginia General Assembly:

Members of the House of Delegates
Members of the Virginia House of Delegates for the First Virginia General Assembly:

Employees
 Senate Clerk: John Pendleton Jr.
 House Clerk: John Tazewell

See also
 List of Virginia state legislatures

References

External links
 Virginia General Assembly website

1776 in Virginia
Virginia legislative sessions